The Women's Western Open was an annual golf competition, which was played in match play between 1930 and 1954, and strokeplay between 1955 and 1967. It was established in 1930 and was a women's major championship that was organized by the Women's Western Golf Association. This event has the distinction of being the first women's major championship ever played.

Patty Berg holds the record for the most victories with seven, which is the overall record of the combined eras of match and stroke play.  During match play competition Berg, Louise Suggs, and Babe Zaharias holds the record for most victories with four. In the stroke play era, Berg and Mickey Wright holds the record for most victories with three. The most consecutive in the combined eras is two and was done by the following golfers: Berg, Suggs, Zaharias, Opal Hill and Wright.  Berg and Betsy Rawls are the only two golfers to win the competition in match play and stroke play eras.  In the match play era, 9&8 was the largest margin of victory by Marian McDougall in 1934, Hill in 1935, and Betty Jameson in 1942.  During the stroke play era, Kathy Whitworth holds the record for lowest under-par at 11 in 1967 and the aggregate low of 289,

Key

Champions
Note: All winners (and runners-up from the match play era) were from the United States.

Match play era

Stroke play era

Multiple winners
This table lists the golfers who have won more than one Women's Western Open as a major championship. Bolded years and player name indicates consecutive victories. The (a) denotes amateur golfer.

Winners by nationality
This table lists the total number of titles won by golfers of each nationality as a major.

Notes
 Joyce Ziske won in a sudden death playoff over Barbara Romack on the second hole with a par-5 to Romack's bogey 6.
 Mickey Wright won in a sudden death playoff over Mary Lena Faulk on the fourth hole with a par-3 to Faulk's bogey 4.

See also
Chronological list of LPGA major golf champions
List of LPGA major championship winning golfers
Grand Slam (golf)

References

External links
 LPGA Tour Grand Slam History

Western
Cham